La Mirada Mall was a  regional shopping mall at the southeast corner of La Mirada Boulevard (originally named Luitwieler) and Rosecrans Avenue in La Mirada, California, in southeast Los Angeles County, in a region known as the Gateway Cities. It is now the site of the La Mirada Theater Center, a strip mall.

In the early 1970s, Canadian developer Mark Tanz invested about $7 million to turn a loosely arranged, growing collection of stores into an enclosed mall next to a renovated outdoor plaza with fountains and trees. Over the years, stores that came and went included J.J. Newberry, Woolco, Ohrbach's, Barker Bros., Lucky Stores, Market Basket, the La Mirada Theatre (cinema), and Robert's Department Store. The former open-air nearly double in size in its transition to a fully-enclosed mall.

In the early 1980s, failing to create a unique profile among the dozen or so malls in the Gateway Cities area, the mall shifted to profiling itself as a "discount mall" with lower rents and stores that offered discounted, but name-brand, merchandise.

But by early 1988, the decision had been made to demolish the mall and reduce its size. By 1990, demolition began on the old mall, and this land is now the site of a UFC gym (originally Toys R Us) and other outbuildings. What were the outbuildings of the original mall's north side were renovated and these are now the main strip center anchored by an Albertsons supermarket, CVS Pharmacy (originally Sav-On Drugs), AMC Theatres and the La Mirada Theatre for the Performing Arts.

References

Shopping malls in Southeast Los Angeles County, California
Demolished shopping malls in the United States
La Mirada, California
Buildings and structures demolished in 1990